The main article describes all European Soling Championships from one the first held in 1968 to the announced Championships in the near future. This article states the detailed results, where relevant the controversies, and the progression of the Championship during the series race by race of the European Soling Championships in the years 2020, 2021, 2022, 2023 and 2024. This is based on the major sources: World Sailing, the world governing body for the sport of sailing recognized by the IOC and the IPC, and the publications of the International Soling Association.

2020 Cancelled due to COVID-19 

The Soling Europeans were scheduled from 4–12 July 2020 as sub-event of the Warnemünder Woche in Germany. Due to the COVID-19 pandemic the event was cancelled. The International Soling Association brainstormed if an alternate date and a location in Austria could be a solution. Finally the decision was made not to jeopardize the health Soling compatitors, host club organizers and other stakeholders and the event was cancelled.

2021 Final results

Postponement and Relocation 
The event was scheduled for spring 2021 in Santander, Spain as part of the Santander International Sailing Week. Like in 2020 the COVID-19 situation in Europe was still unsafe and governmental restrictions made it difficult to held the event. When the Santander International Sailing Week was cancelled by the host club he International Soling Association asked Italy to prepare a European Soling Championship in autumn. When the pandemic situation became more safe and the restrictions were partly lifted in Europe the Championship could be rolled out in Mandello del Lario, Italy.

 2021 Progress

2022 Final results 

 2022 Progress

2023 Bid process 

The 2023 Soling European Championship is not granted to a host club yet. Since the International Soling Association tries to alternate lake sailing and open water sailing the 2023 Europeans should preferably be organized on open water. Among the potential bidding host countries are:
 Germany: Warnemünde
 Spain: Palamos

2024 Bid Process 

The 2024 Soling European Championship is not granted to a host club yet. Since the International Soling Association tries to alternate lake sailing and open water sailing the 2024 Europeans should preferably be organized on a lake.

Further results
For further results see:
 Soling European Championship results (1968–1979)
 Soling European Championship results (1980–1984)
 Soling European Championship results (1985–1989)
 Soling European Championship results (1990–1994)
 Soling European Championship results (1995–1999)
 Soling European Championship results (2000–2004)
 Soling European Championship results (2005–2009)
 Soling European Championship results (2010–2014)
 Soling European Championship results (2015–2019)
 Soling European Championship results (2020–2024)

References

Soling European Championships